The discography of Bauhaus, a British gothic rock band, consists of five studio albums, four live albums, three compilation albums, four extended plays (EPs), eleven singles and three video albums. The band was formed in Northampton in 1978 by Daniel Ash (guitar), David J (bass), Kevin Haskins (drums) and Peter Murphy (vocals).

Released in August 1979 on Small Wonder Records, Bauhaus's debut single—the nine-minute-long "Bela Lugosi's Dead"—failed to make the UK Singles Chart. The band signed with 4AD in 1980 and released three more singles, all of which failed to chart. They also released their debut album, In the Flat Field, in 1980 and this became the band's first release to chart when it reached No. 72 on the UK Albums Chart. After changing labels again in 1981 to Beggars Banquet Records, the band made the UK Singles Chart for the first time with "Kick in the Eye", which reached No. 59.

Their follow-up single, "The Passion of Lovers", reached No. 56. After the band's second album, Mask (1981), reached No. 30 on the UK Albums Chart, the next two singles failed to reach the Top 40 of the UK Singles Chart. October 1982 saw the band's highest showing in the UK Singles Chart when they released a cover version of David Bowie's "Ziggy Stardust", which reached No. 15—as well as reaching No. 13 on the Irish Singles Chart. Also released in October 1982, The Sky's Gone Out reached No. 4 on the UK Albums Chart. The band released two more singles and an album in 1983, all of which failed to capitalise on the success of their releases in late 1982, before disbanding.

After disbanding, all four members of Bauhaus undertook various solo projects before Ash, David J and Kevin Haskins reformed as Love and Rockets in 1985. Bauhaus reformed for the Resurrection Tour in 1998 and for a one-off concert in April 2005. Another reunion tour followed towards the end of 2005, before work started on a new album Go Away White, released in March 2008. The album charted poorly, only reaching No. 120 on the UK Albums Chart, but gave the band their first entry for a studio album on the US Billboard 200 when it reached No. 105. Following the release of the album, Bauhaus disbanded again.

Albums

Studio albums

Live albums

Compilation albums

Video albums

A DVD release contains Shadow of Light and Archive.

EPs

Singles

Other singles

Music videos

References

External links

Discography
Rock music group discographies
Discographies of British artists